Dr Maarten Joost Maria Christenhusz (born 27 April 1976) is a Dutch botanist, natural historian and photographer.

Career 
He was born in Enschede, the Netherlands, received his undergraduate and master's degrees from Utrecht University in Biology, and earned his PhD from the University of Turku, Finland in 2007. He is an authority on fern, gymnosperm and angiosperm classification, and is a contributor to the Angiosperm Phylogeny Group (compiler of APG IV). He has specialised in Marattiaceae and he described many species of Danaea, including Danaea kalevala from the Lesser Antilles. A species of Moraceae, Dorstenia christenhuszii was named in honour of its discoverer. He is editor for the Linnean Society. He lives in Kingston-upon-Thames, Surrey, UK.

He is the former chief editor and initiator of the botanical journal Phytotaxa, an associate editor of the Botanical Journal of the Linnean Society and chief editor of the Zoological Journal of the Linnean Society. He has an interest in island biogeography, botanical gardens, floristic treatments, horticulture, photography, natural history and taxonomy.
He works as a botanical consultant 
He is the lead author (together with Michael F. Fay and Mark W. Chase) of an encyclopedia of vascular plants called Plants of the World.

Vascular plant families and genera that were named by him or together with colleagues. (See also Taxa named by Maarten J. M. Christenhusz.)

Species that were named by him or together with colleagues.

Honours
 President of the International Association of Pteridologists (2009–2019)

Selected bibliography 
 APG IV (2016) An update of the Angiosperm Phylogeny Group classification for the orders and families of flowering plants: APG IV. Botanical Journal of the Linnean Society 181(1): 1–20. 
 M. J. M. Christenhusz, M. F. Fay & M. W. Chase (2017) Plants of the World. Kew Publishing/Chicago University Press.
 M. W. Chase, M. J. M. Christenhusz & T. Mirenda (2017) The Book of Orchids. Ivy Press/Chicago University Press, .
 M. J. M. Christenhusz & J. W. Byng (2016) The number of known plant species in the world and its annual increase. Phytotaxa 261(3): 201–217.
 S. Zona & M. J. M. Christenhusz (2015) Litter-trapping plants: Filter-feeders of the plant kingdom. Botanical Journal of the Linnean Society 179(4): 554–586.
 M. J. M. Christenhusz, S. Brockington, A. Christin, & R. Sage (2014) On the disintegration of Molluginaceae: a new genus and family (Kewa, Kewaceae) segregated from Hypertelis, and placement of Macarthuria in Macarthuriaceae. Phytotaxa 181(4): 238–242.
 M. J. M. Christenhusz & M. W. Chase (2014) Trends and concepts in fern classification. Annals of Botany 113(4): 571–594.

References

External links 
Information from the University of Helsinki
Maarten Christenhusz on ResearchGate
 for botanical consultancy services.
 for personal blog

1976 births
Living people
21st-century Dutch botanists
Utrecht University alumni
University of Turku alumni
People from Enschede
Pteridologists
Dutch pteridologists